The Witcher is a series of fantasy action role-playing games developed by CD Projekt Red and published by CD Projekt. It is based on the book series of the same name by Polish writer Andrzej Sapkowski, acting as non-canonical sequels to the story of the books.

The main series began in 2007 with the release of The Witcher, and concluded with 2015's The Witcher 3: Wild Hunt. As of 2022, the series has three main standalone games, two expansion packs and seven spin-off games. The series is critically acclaimed and commercially successful, selling over 50 million copies worldwide by May 2020.

In March 2022, a fourth installment of the franchise was announced to be in early development and is planned as the start of a new trilogy for the series. In October 2022, a remake of The Witcher was announced. Fool's Theory will mainly develop the game with full creative supervision from The Witcher series staff and CD Projekt Red. Another game will also be developed by The Molasses Flood and created with support from CDPR.

Gameplay
The series revolves around Geralt of Rivia, a skilled monster hunter, and his adventures in a fantasy world of magic, political intrigue, and dangerous creatures. The gameplay mainly focuses on exploration, combat, and decision-making as the player navigates Geralt in the game world, completing quests, and fighting enemies. The series is known for its intricate narratives, morally ambiguous choices, and attention to detail in creating rich and immersive worlds for players to explore. 

The games are represented in a third-person view perspective in a partially open world environment. During the game, the player is faced with difficult decisions that affect the ending of the story and the game world. The choices players make in The Witcher games can have immediate and long-term consequences, affecting relationships between characters, opening up new quests and storylines. 

The quests have multiple solutions and branching paths, depending on the player's choices, adding to the game's replayability and encouraging exploration. Many quests involve interacting with NPCs and building relationships with them, which can lead to different outcomes and branching paths in the story. The series also features a variety of quest types, including main story quests, side quests, contracts, and treasure hunts. Each quest type offers a unique challenge and reward, ranging from advancing the story to obtaining rare loot or unlocking new areas. 

Potions are consumable items that Geralt, can use to temporarily enhance his abilities. Players can choose which skills to invest in based on their preferred playstyle and customize Geralt's skills to their liking. In addition to potions and abilities, the game also includes equipment upgrades such as weapons and armor that can further enhance Geralt's abilities. Crafting and upgrading gear is another important aspect of the game where players must gather resources and work with crafters to create the gear that best suits Geralt's needs.

Releases

Main series

The Witcher

In 1996 and 1997, a Witcher video game was being developed by Metropolis Software in Poland, but it was canceled. The game's director was Adrian Chmielarz, former People Can Fly co-owner and creative director, who coined the translation "The Witcher" during its development. According to Chmielarz, the game would have been a 3D action-adventure game with role-playing elements such as moral choices and experience points.

In 2003, Polish video-game developer CD Projekt Red negotiated with Sapkowski for rights to The Witcher, given the languishing work at Metropolis, and released The Witcher, a role-playing game based on the saga in October 2007 for personal computers. It was well-publicized and, although it was the developer's first game, it received critical praise in Europe and North America. The Witcher was published in Poland by CD Projekt and worldwide by Atari. A console version, The Witcher: Rise of the White Wolf with the same story and a different engine and combat system, was scheduled for release in fall 2009 but was canceled that spring. The game's story takes place around five years after the events of the main book saga.

The Witcher 2: Assassins of Kings

The Witcher 2: Assassins of Kings is the sequel to The Witcher, developed by CD Projekt Red. On 16 September 2009, before Assassins of Kings was introduced, a video of the game was leaked; two days later, CD Projekt Red confirmed that it was in development. Assassins of Kings was published in Poland by CD Projekt, by Namco Bandai Games in Europe and by Atari in North America. The game was also distributed digitally through Steam and DRM-free on Good Old Games. It takes place around half a year after the events of the first game.

The Witcher 3: Wild Hunt

The Witcher 3: Wild Hunt was released on 19 May 2015 and quickly came to be considered one of the greatest video games of all time, shipping over ten million copies by March 2016. Subsequently two expansion packs were released, The Witcher 3: Wild Hunt – Hearts of Stone in 2015 and The Witcher 3: Wild Hunt – Blood and Wine in 2016. The game was updated in December 2022 with a variety of visual enhancements and gameplay tweaks.

The Witcher Remake 
A remake of The Witcher (2007) which was formerly first teased under the codename, Canis Majoris. The original game will be rebuilt from the ground up in Unreal Engine 5 by Fool's Theory with full creative supervision from The Witcher series staff and CD Projekt Red.

Project Polaris 
Polaris is a codename for the next installment in The Witcher series. It will use Unreal Engine 5 instead of REDengine, which the two previous games used. The game is to be the beginning of a new saga. CDPR aim to release two more Witcher games after Polaris, creating a new AAA RPG trilogy.

Project Sirius 
Sirius is a codename for a game developed by The Molasses Flood and created with support from CDPR. It is said to differ from past productions, offering multiplayer gameplay on top of a single-player experience including a campaign with quests and a story.

Spin-offs

The Witcher: Crimson Trail 
The Witcher: Crimson Trail (Polish: Wiedźmin: Krwawy Szlak), also known as The Witcher Mobile, is a mobile-phone action game created by Breakpoint on license from CD Projekt in November 2007. It features a young Geralt as a promising student who has completed his training to become a monster-slayer – a witcher.

The Witcher Adventure Game 
The Witcher Adventure Game is a digital adaptation of the board game of the same name released in 2014.

The Witcher Battle Arena 
CD Projekt Red announced The Witcher Battle Arena, a free-to-play multiplayer online battle arena game for mobile devices, on 1 July 2014. It shut down at the end of 2015.

Gwent: The Witcher Card Game 
Gwent: The Witcher Card Game is a digital collectible card game released in 2018.

Thronebreaker: The Witcher Tales 
In October 2018, CD Projekt Red released Thronebreaker: The Witcher Tales, a turn-based roleplaying game with similar gameplay to the free-to-play card game Gwent: The Witcher Card Game. In Thronebreaker'''s thirty-hour-long campaign, the player takes the control of Queen Meve, the ruler of Lyria and Rivia, during the events that precede the first Witcher game. The game world consists of five regions never explored in The Witcher franchise before: Rivia, Lyria, Angren, Mahakam and Lower Aedirn. The title received generally favorable reviews.

 The Witcher: Monster Slayer The Witcher: Monster Slayer is an augmented reality video game for mobile devices released in 2021.

 Roach Race Roach Race is a free-to-play platform, sidescroller game co-developed with Crunching Koalas. The game was released for IOS and Android on September 6, 2022. It has an embedded version as a arcade minigame in Cyberpunk 2077 which was released with Patch 1.6 the same day.

Reception
 Critical reception The Witcher series has received generally positive reception from critics and audiences alike.The Witcher received mostly positive reception from critics. Praise was given towards its narrative, branching dialogues, adult themes, setting, RPG elements, leveling and alchemy system, and Geralt's character, though the combat, animations, movement and loading times were criticized.The Witcher 2: Assassins of Kings was deemed an improvement over its predecessor in terms of combat mechanics, customization, graphics, environments, immersion, and storytelling. The major source of critcisim was the difficulty of the combat, especially during the game's first few hours, and gratuitous nudity.The Witcher 3: Wild Hunt received universal acclaim from critics and audiences alike, and has been named one of the greatest games of all time. Praise has been given for its gameplay, narrative, world design, combat, original soundtrack and visuals, although it received minor criticism due to technical issues.

Sales
The series had sold over 33 million copies by March 2018, increasing to over 50 million copies by May 2020.

 Controversy 
In October 2018, Sapkowski sent notice to CD Projekt demanding he be remunerated for sales of The Witcher video games, asking for more than 60 million Polish złoty (more than ) representing between about 5% and 15% of the game's revenues over the years. Sapkowski had originally provided the license to CD Projekt based on a lump sum payment, but now believes he is due more since the series has become much more successful than expected. CD Projekt stated that while they had met all obligations on the initial acquisition of the license, they will work amicably with Sapkowski's legal representatives to come to a fair outcome for all parties. By February 2019, CD Projekt worked out a settlement agreement that would provide Sapkowski additional royalties for their video game series, though not as great as those Sapkowski had asked for, as to maintain a working relationship with the author for future Witcher'' projects. The settlement was finalized by December 2019.

References

External links 
 Official website

Action role-playing video games
Video game franchises
Video game franchises introduced in 2007
Role-playing video games
Video games about curses
Single-player video games
 
Video games about amnesia
Video games developed in Poland
CD Projekt games
Slavic mythology in popular culture